The Proceedings of the Institution of Mechanical Engineers, Part F: Journal of Rail and Rapid Transit is a peer-reviewed scientific journal that covers on engineering applicable to rail and rapid transit. The journal was first published in 1989 as a split-off of Proceedings of the Institution of Mechanical Engineers. It is published by SAGE Publications on behalf of the Institution of Mechanical Engineers.

Abstracting and indexing 
The journal is abstracted and indexed in:

Applied Science & Technology Abstracts
Applied Science & Technology Index
Civil Engineering Abstracts
Current Contents/Engineering, Computer, & Technology
Engineered Materials Abstracts
SAE International/Global Mobility Database
Inspec
Mechanical Engineering Abstracts
Metals Abstracts/METADEX
Science Citation Index
According to the Journal Citation Reports, its 2013 impact factor is 0.743, ranking it 76th out of 124 journals in the category "Engineering, Civil", 76th out of 126 journals in the category "Engineering, Mechanical", and 20th out of 30 journals in the category "Transportation Science and Technology".

References

External links 
 

Bimonthly journals
Engineering journals
English-language journals
Institution of Mechanical Engineers academic journals
Publications established in 1989
SAGE Publishing academic journals